The 23rd Guards Tallinn Fighter Aviation Regiment (Military Unit Number 77984) is a fighter aviation regiment of the Russian Air Force. Based at Dzyomgi, the regiment is part of the 303rd Mixed Aviation Division of the 11th Air and Air Defense Forces Army. Flying the Sukhoi Su-35S, the regiment participated in the 2022 Russian invasion of Ukraine.

History 
The regiment was formed in 2000 as the 23rd Fighter Aviation Regiment by the merger of the 60th Fighter Aviation Regiment and the 404th Tallinn Order of Kutuzov Fighter Aviation Regiment. 

In December 2009, the 23rd Fighter Aviation Regiment was reorganized during reforms of the Russian Air Force, becoming the 6987th Aviation Base. The regiment was recreated and on 29 January 2018 received the Tallinn honorific, perpetuating the traditions of the 404th Fighter Aviation Regiment. Beginning in early August 2018, a flight from the regiment was stationed at Yasny air base on Iturup in the Kuril Islands. The regiment is part of the 303rd Mixed Aviation Division of the 11th Air and Air Defense Forces Army, based at Dzyomgi Airport. The regiment participated in aerial warfare in the 2022 Russian invasion of Ukraine. Regimental navigator Major Viktor Anatolyevich Dudin was awarded the title Hero of Russia on 4 March for downing a Ukrainian Su-27 during the invasion, becoming the first pilot to receive the award during the war. Regimental deputy commander Lieutenant Colonel Ilya Andreyevich Sizov received his Hero of Russia medal on 21 July, credited by state media with the destruction of eleven Ukrainian aircraft and thwarting an attempt to recapture Snake Island. For "mass heroism and courage in battle," the regiment received the Guards designation on 17 November 2022 as a reward for its performance in the Russian invasion of Ukraine. That month, Sizov announced that the pilots of the unit were undergoing theoretical training on the Sukhoi Su-57 at the 4th Center for Combat Employment and Retraining of Personnel, as the regiment was slated to become the first operational unit to receive the Su-57 in 2023.

References 

Regiments of the Russian Air Force from 2014
Military units and formations of the 2022 Russian invasion of Ukraine